This is a list of Japanese speculative fiction writers. Writers are sorted alphabetically by surname.

A
 Kōbō Abe (1924–1993, real name Kimifusa Abe
 Hirotaka Adachi (real name of Otsuichi)
 Jirō Akagawa (b. 1948)
 Mizuhito Akiyama (b. 1971)
 Motoko Arai (b. 1960)
 Mizuhito Akiyama (b. 1971)
 Kunio Aramaki (real name of Yoshio Aramaki)
 Yoshimasa Aramaki (real name of Yoshio Aramaki)
 Yoshio Aramaki (b. 1933)
 Hiroshi Aramata (b. 1947)
 Alice Arisugawa or Arisu Arisugawa (b. 1959)
 Taku Ashibe (b. 1958)
 Yukito Ayatsuji (b. 1960)

B–D

 Chen Shunchen (pseudonym of Chin Shunshin)
 Chen Soon Shin (pseudonym of Chin Shunshin)
 Kimio Chiba (real name of Ryu Mitsuse)
 Chihitsudō (pseudonym of Hisashi Inoue)
 Chin Shunshin (1924–2015)
 Gakuto Coda, Gakuto Kōda (b. 1977)

E–G

 Toh EnJoe or Tō Enjō (b. 1972)
 Taiyo Fujii or Taiyō Fujii (b. 1971)
 Masako Fukae (real name of Masako Mori)
 Masami Fukushima (1929–1976)

H
 Ryō Hanmura or Ryō Hammura ( 1933–2002)
 Hideshi Hino ( 1946)
 Akira Hori ( b. 1944)
 Shinichi Hoshi or Shin'ichi Hoshi ( 1926-1997)

I–J

 Kimio Iizuka (real name of Ryu Mitsuse)
 Sumiyo Imaoka (real name of Kaoru Kurimoto)
 Hisashi Inoue (1934–2010)
 Fujio Ishihara (b. 1933)
 Junji Ito or Junji Itō (. b. 1963)
 Keikaku Itō (pseudonym of Project Itoh)
 Satoshi Itō (real name of Project Itoh)
 Shimako Iwai (b. 1964)

K–L

 Shinji Kajio (. b. 1947)
 Chōhei Kambayashi or Chōhei Kanbayashi (b. 1953)
 Musashi Kanbe (b. 1948)
 Hajime Kanzaka (b. 1964)
 Kyō Katō (pseudonym of Masami Fukushima)
 Masami Katō (pseudonym of Masami Fukushima)
 Chiaki Kawamata (b. 1948)
 Hideyuki Kikuchi (b. 1949)
 Yusuke Kishi or Yūsuke Kishi (b. 1959)
 Morio Kita (1927–2011)
 Heitarō Kiyono (real name of Ryō Hanmura)
 Yasumi Kobayashi (b. 1962)
 Gakuto Koda or Gakuto Kōda
 Izuki Kogyoku or Izuki Kōgyoku (b. 1984)
 Minoru Komatsu (real name of Sakyo Komatsu)
 Sakyo Komatsu or Sakyō Komatsu (1931–2011)
 Chiaki J. Konaka or Chiaki Konaka (b. 1961)
 Yoji Kondo or Yōji Kondō (1933–2017)
 Eric Kotani, pseudonym of Yoji Kondo)
 Rei Kozumi (pseudonym of Takumi Shibano)
 Kaoru Kurimoto (1953–2009)
 Ken Kuronuma (1902–1985)

M
 Gorō Masaki (b. 1957)
 Jun Masaki (pseudonym of Jun'ya Yokota)
 Taku Mayumura (b. 1934)
 Gakuto Mikumo (b. 1970)
 Hiroko Minagawa (b. 1930)
 Ryu Mitsuse or Ryū Mitsuse (1928–1999)
 Miyuki Miyabe (b. 1960)
 Masako Mori (b. 1944)
 Hiroyuki Morioka (b. 1962)
 Daijiro Morohoshi (b. 1949) manga artist
 Haruki Murakami (b. 1949)

N
 Norio Nakai (b. 1952)
 Azusa Nakajima (pseudonym of Kaoru Kurimoto)
 Azusa Noa (b. 1954)
 Hōsuke Nojiri (b. 1961)
 Asa Nonami (b. 1960)
 Mahokaru Numata (b. 1948)

O–R

 Kenzaburō Ōe (b. 1935)
 Issui Ogawa (b. 1975)
 Noriko Ogiwara (b. 1959)
 Mariko Ōhara (b. 1959)
 Fuyumi Ono (b. 1960)
 Masaari Oshikawa (real name of Shunrō Oshikawa)
 Shunrō Oshikawa (1876–1914)
 Otsuichi (b. 1978)
 Project Itoh or Keikaku Itō (1974–2009)
 Ryukishi07 (b. 1973)

S
 Hiroshi Sakurazaka (b. 1970)
 Shōichi Sano (real name of Unno Juza)
 Yūichi Sasamoto (b. 1963)
 Daisuke Satō (1964–2017)
 Sōkichi Saitō (real name of Morio Kita)
 Hideaki Sena (b. 1968)
 Takumi Shibano (1926–2010)
 Tatsuhiko Shibusawa (1928–1987)
 Tatsuo Shibusawa (real name of Tatsuhiko Shibusawa)
 Yoshinori Shimizu (b. 1947)
 Kazuma Shinjō
 Setsuko Shinoda (b. 1955)
 Hiroe Suga (b. 1963)
 Taidō Sugiyama (real name (Buddhist name) Yumeno Kyūsaku)
 Koji Suzuki, Kōji Suzuki (b. 1957)

T
 Kiyoshi Takayanagi (real name of Chōhei Kambayashi)
 Haruka Takachiho (b. 1951)
 Akimitsu Takagi (1920–1995)
 Seiichi Takagi (real name of Akimitsu Takagi)
 Katsuhiko Takahashi (b. 1947)
 Haneko Takayama (b. 1975)
 Kimiyoshi Takekawa (real name of Haruka Takachiho)
 Kōshū Tani (b. 1951)
 Nagaru Tanigawa (b. 1970)
 Hirotaka Tobi (b. 1960)
 Eiji Tsuburaya (1901–1970)
 Eiichi Tsumuraya (real name of Eiji Tsuburaya)
 Yasutaka Tsutsui (b. 1934)

U–V
 Tow Ubukata or Tō Ubukata (b. 1977)
 Naoyuki Uchida (real name of Yukito Ayatsuji)
 Hisashi Uchiyama (pseudonym of Hisashi Inoue)
 Sayuri Ueda (b. 1964)
 Masahide Uehara (real name of Alice Arisugawa)
 Nahoko Uehashi (b. 1962)
 Kazuo Umezu (b. 1936) manga artist
 Unno Juza, Unno Jūza, or Unno Jūzō (1897–1949)
 Gen Urobuchi (b. 1972)

W–Z

 Soichiro Watase or Sōichirō Watase (b. 1978)
 Masaki Yamada (b. 1950)
 Bochō Yamamura (1884–1924)
 Tetsu Yano (1923–2004)
 Baku Yumemakura (b. 1951)
 Yumeno Kyūsaku (1889–1936)

See also
 List of fantasy authors
 List of horror fiction writers
 List of science fiction authors
 List of Japanese writers
 List of Japanese women writers
 List of Japanese-language poets
 Lists of writers

+Speculative fiction
Japanese speculative fiction

Authors, Japanese

Authors, Japanese

Authors, Japanese